Mark Storey is a board member of the Naturist Action Committee and has testified at anti-nudity legislation hearings all over the United States.

As editor for Nude & Natural, the magazine of The Naturist Society, he has written various narratives of the naturist events he has participated in or helped organize, as well as places he has traveled to. He wrote an article on the nude beaches of Long Island on the east coast and participated in the Fremont Fresh Air Festival along with two other intrepid clothes-free activists as nude bicyclers to much media attention.

He is a founding member of the Body Freedom Collaborative in Seattle whose goal is to bring attention for the need for legal clothing-optional beaches through "guerilla pranksterism", among other approaches. He co-founded World Naked Gardening Day and is the current lead on that project.

In 1999 he led the effort to defeat Washington Senate Bill 5351, a measure that would have placed skinny-dippers on the state's list of sex offenders.

Mark is also author of a book, Cinema Au Naturel: A History of Nudist Film, and editor of another, Theatre au Naturel: A Collection of Naturist Plays. In 2003, he was instrumental in getting several of the plays later published in this book performed at the Seattle Fringe Festival.

Notes

Further reading

Books authored
Storey, Mark Theatre au Naturel: A Collection of Naturist Plays (Trade Paperback) Heureka Productions (June 20, 2005).
Storey, Mark Cinema Au Naturel: A History of Nudist Film. Naturist Education Foundation (July 1, 2003).
Storey, Mark, et al., The World's Best Nude Beaches and Resorts - The Top 1,000 Places to get Naked, The Naturist Society LLC and Lifestyle Press Ltd (2007).

Articles authored
"Social Nudity, Sexual Attraction, and Respect", Nude & Natural, 24.3 Spring 2005.
"Children, Social Nudity and Academic Research", Nude & Natural, 23.4 Summer 2004.
"Takin' It to the Streets: The Cutting Edge of Naturism", Nude & Natural,  23.4: p. 73, Summer 2004. Mark claimed that "The future of naturism is on public lands. To gain naturist freedoms on public lands will require getting naked in public".
"The Offense of Public Nudity", Nude & Natural
"Naturism and Civil Disobedience", Nude & Natural
"The Bethell Approach: A Protest Colloquy/The Bethell Approach: Is the Time for Mass Nude Protests Upon Us?", Nude & Natural, 21.2 Winter 2002. Includes statements by Vincent Bethell, Mark Nisbet, Cec Cinder, Paul Rapoport, Les Rootsey, Morley Schloss, T.A. Wyner, and Mark Storey.
"Guerilla Nudity/Wave Makers: Introducing the Body Freedom Collaborative", Nude & Natural, Issue 23.1, Autumn 2003.

Press coverage
George, Kathy (April 7, 2003), "Exposed and stark naked – on purpose: But not all nudists support 'guerrilla' plans for prominent public exposure",  Seattle Post-Intelligencer.

See also
List of social nudity organizations
List of places where social nudity is practised
Naturism
Nudity
Nude swimming

External links
The Naturist Society Foundation

American activists
Social nudity advocates
American naturists
Year of birth missing (living people)
Living people